Alfred John Brown (14 September 1897 – 29 January 1978) was an English theatre, film and television actor.

The obituarist in The Times noted that Brown fought in both World Wars, winning the Military Cross in the First. He was intended for the legal profession, but abandoned his father's solicitor's practice in the early 1920s in favour of the stage. His theatre successes included Michael Frayn's comedies Alphabetical Order and Donkey's Years, in the second of which he was performing at the time of his sudden death.

He appeared in many British television series and films including The Adventures of Robin Hood, Dixon of Dock Green, Bomb in the High Street, The Trials of Oscar Wilde, Lord Jim, Out of the Unknown, Emergency – Ward 10, The Avengers and Hands of the Ripper.

Screen credits

References

External links

1897 births
1978 deaths
English male stage actors
English male film actors
English male television actors
20th-century English male actors